Dodd Island is a small island in the southeast part of the Publications Ice Shelf about  south of the Sostrene Islands. First mapped by the Lars Christensen Expedition (1936–37) from air photos, it was remapped by the Australian National Antarctic Research Expeditions, and was named by the Antarctic Names Committee of Australia for D.M. Dodd, a weather observer at Davis Station in 1963.

See also 
 List of antarctic and sub-antarctic islands

References 

Islands of Princess Elizabeth Land